Philip Joseph Gagliano (December 27, 1941 – December 19, 2016) was an American professional baseball player who forged a 12-season, 702-game career in Major League Baseball as a utility infielder/outfielder and pinch hitter for four clubs (principally the St. Louis Cardinals) between  and .

A native of Memphis, Tennessee, Gagliano came from a baseball family; he was the nephew of a prominent American Legion and high school coach, Tony Gagliano, and his younger brother Ralph also was an infielder in professional baseball who appeared in the majors, although only for one game in 1965. Phil graduated from Memphis' Christian Brothers High School, where he played for his uncle and was a teammate and schoolmate of Tim McCarver. Gagliano and McCarver, as fellow Cardinals from 1963 through , became two of the four Christian Brothers High School baseball alumni to have played in the World Series as of 2017.

Gagliano reached the majors for the first time after three full years in the St. Louis farm system; then he spent 3 months of the  season on the Redbird roster as a pinch hitter and backup second baseman before returning to Triple-A to complete his minor-league seasoning. In , he spent the first of ten full seasons as a major-leaguer, and, with regular second baseman Julián Javier hobbled by injuries, established career-bests in games played (122), games started (90, including 48 at second base, 25 in the outfield, and 19 at third base), and in most offensive categories, including hits (87), runs scored (46), extra-base hits (24), home runs (eight) and runs batted in (53, fifth on the club).

Gagliano's tenure in St. Louis ended in May  when he was traded to the Chicago Cubs, who used him in only 26 games over the last four months of the campaign. After his contract was purchased by the Boston Red Sox from the Cubs at the Winter Meetings on December 2, 1970, he established himself as one of the majors' top pinch hitters of the day. From  through , he batted .364, .346 and .366, with 32 hits, in pinch-hitting roles for the 1971– Red Sox and the  Cincinnati Reds. But in 1974, Gagliano could muster only two hits and 15 bases on balls in 46 plate appearances, and he retired from baseball.

In his 702 MLB games, Gagliano collected 336 hits, with 50 doubles, seven triples, 14 home runs, and 159 career RBI. He batted .238 lifetime. Despite his success from 1971–1973, he batted only .201 over his 12-year career as a pinch hitter. In the field, he appeared in 171 games at second base, 133 at third, 64 as a corner outfielder, 30 as a first baseman, and two as a shortstop.

After leaving baseball, he worked in sales and operations management and retired in 2002. Phil Gagliano died at his home in Hollister, Missouri, on December 19, 2016, at the age of 74.

References

External links

Phil Gagliano - Baseballbiography.com
Retrosheet

1941 births
2016 deaths
Atlanta Crackers players
Baseball players from Memphis, Tennessee
Boston Red Sox players
Chicago Cubs players
Cincinnati Reds players
Dothan Cardinals players
Jacksonville Suns players
Major League Baseball infielders
Memphis Chickasaws players
People from Taney County, Missouri
Portland Beavers players
St. Louis Cardinals players
St. Louis Cardinals scouts